Kimjongilia is a flower named after the late North Korean leader Kim Jong-il. It is a hybrid cultivar of tuberous begonia, registered as Begonia × tuberhybrida 'Kimjongilhwa'. When Kim Jong-il died in December 2011, the flower was used to adorn his body for public display. Despite its name, the Kimjongilia is not the official national flower of North Korea, which is the Magnolia sieboldii. Another flower, Kimilsungia, is an orchid cultivar named after Kim Jong-il's father and predecessor, Kim Il-sung.

History
To commemorate Kim Jong-il's 46th birthday in 1988, Japanese botanist Kamo Mototeru cultivated a new perennial begonia named "kimjongilia" (literally, "flower of Kim Jong-il"), representing the Juche revolutionary cause of the Dear Leader. It was presented as a "token of friendship between Korea and Japan". The flower symbolizes wisdom, love, justice and peace. It is designed to bloom every year on Kim Jong-il's birthday, February 16.

Bloom
The flower has been cultivated to bloom around the Day of the Shining Star, Kim Jong-il's birthday, 16 February. According to the Korean Central News Agency, a preservation agent had been developed that would allow the flower to keep in bloom for longer periods of time.

Song
A song composed by several North Korean composers, also called "Kimjongilia", was written about the flower:

See also
Kimilsungia
Kimjongilia (film)

References

Further reading

External links

 

Begonia
Kim Jong-il
National symbols of North Korea
Ornamental plant cultivars
Propaganda in North Korea